El Tejar is a corregimiento in Alanje District, Chiriquí Province, Panama. Its population as of 1990 was 1,164; its population as of 2000 was 1,507.

References

Corregimientos of Chiriquí Province